The 1998 Croatian Indoors was a men's tennis tournament played on indoor carpet courts in Split, Croatia, that was part of the International Series of the 1998 ATP Tour. It was the only edition of the tournament and was held 2–9 February 1998.

Seeds
Champion seeds are indicated in bold text while text in italics indicates the round in which those seeds were eliminated.

Draw

Finals

Top half

Bottom half

References

1998
Singles
Sport in Split, Croatia
1998 in Croatian tennis